The Kazakhstan-class missile boats are domestically produced missile boats from Kazakhstan's Uralsk Plant Zenit JSC. They are the first domestically produced naval vessels in Kazakhstan and are stationed in the Caspian Sea in service with the Kazakh Navy. Ships in the class have a displacement of 240 tons, a top speed of 30 knots, and are armed with "modernized anti-aircraft missile and artillery units." They are the largest vessels in the Kazakh Navy arsenal. There are four ships in the class, named Kazakhstan, Oral, Saryarka, and Mangistau.

References

Missile boat classes
Kazakh Naval Forces